Kheyrabad (also Romanized as Kheyrābād) is a village in Jowzan Rural District, in the Central District of Malayer County, Hamadan Province, Iran. At the 2006 census, its population was 29, in 9 families.

References 

Populated places in Malayer County